Population Studies is a triannual peer-reviewed academic journal covering demography. It was established in 1947 and is published by Taylor & Francis on behalf of the Population Investigation Committee. The founding editor-in-chief was David Glass, who edited the journal from 1947 until his death in 1978. The current editor-in-chief is John Ermisch (University of Oxford). According to the Journal Citation Reports, the journal has a 2018 impact factor of 1.702, ranking it 19th out of 29 journals in the category "Demography".

Past Editors
2017- John Ermisch (University of Oxford)
1997-2016 John Simons (London School of Hygiene and Tropical Medicine)
1978-1996 Eugene Grebenik (Office of Population Censuses and Surveys)
1947-1978 David Glass (sociologist) (London School of Economics)

References

External links

English-language journals
Publications established in 1947
Demography journals
Taylor & Francis academic journals
Triannual journals